Danyon Hume (born 25 July 1996) is a speedway rider from England.

Career
He began his British speedway career riding for the Rye House Raiders during the 2015 National League speedway season. The following year in 2016, he signed for Ipswich Witches at the back end of the season 

In 2017, he sustained a major arm injury at Poole which sidelined him for the remainder of that season. In 2019 as the club captain, he helped Leicester Lion Cubs win the division 3 league and cup double during the 2019 National Development League speedway season. In 2021, he rode for the Sheffield Tigers in the SGB Premiership, in addition to riding for the Poole Pirates in the SGB Championship.

In 2022, he rode for the Ipswich Witches in the SGB Premiership as the number 8 rider and joined Glasgow Tigers in the SGB Championship.

In 2023, he retained his place at the Ipswich Witches, while signing for Redcar Bears in the SGB Championship.

References 

1996 births
Living people
British speedway riders
Birmingham Brummies riders
Glasgow Tigers riders
Ipswich Witches riders
Poole Pirates riders
Redcar Bears riders
Sheffield Tigers riders